Francisco de Sarmiento (1498 – August 7, 1539) was a Spanish commanding officer best known for his role in the siege of Castelnuovo, where he was killed by the Ottomans. At this battle, Sarmiento offered a fierce resistance, inflicting heavy losses on the Ottomans, who outnumbered his troops by far.

Biography

Early life
It is said he was a native of Burgos, and to have descended from infant Don Juan Manuel, son of the Castilian and King Fernando III. He was the uncle of Francisco Sarmiento Mendoza.

It is said that he forged himself in the Italian Wars, fighting in Naples, Caserta, and Benevento.

Siege of Castelnuovo
At the siege of Castelnuovo, Sarmiento fought 50,000 Ottomans with about three thousand men. He chose to keep on fighting against the Ottomans till the end, refusing to make pacts with them, even though they outnumbered them by far and he knew the Holy League could not come to their help. In the last and definitive attack, Francisco de Sarmiento, on horseback, was wounded in the face by three arrows, but he continued to encourage his men.

He inflicted heavy losses on the Ottomans, killing all of the Janissaries and many from the other Ottoman units. Something between 10,000 and 20,000 Ottomans were killed by the Spaniards in what resulted in an Ottoman Pyrrhic victory.

In the last clash, Sarmiento ordered the 600 Spanish survivors to retreat and go defend the castle where the civilian population of Castelnuovo had taken refuge. Although the withdrawal was made in perfect order and discipline, Sarmiento and his men found that the doors of the castle were walled at their arrival. Sarmiento was offered a rope to raise him to the walls, but he refused to save himself and let his companions die. Thus, he joined Machín de Munguía, Juan Vizcaíno, and Sancho Frias to lead the last stand. Surrounded by the Ottoman army, the last Spanish soldiers fiercely fought until their death. Castelnuovo was lost to the Ottomans, who suffered huge casualties.

References

Bibliography

Spanish generals
People of the Ottoman–Venetian Wars
People from Burgos
16th-century Spanish people
Spanish military personnel killed in action
1539 deaths
1498 births